The 1983 FA Charity Shield was the 61st FA Charity Shield, an annual football match played between the winners of the previous season's First Division and FA Cup competitions. The match was played on 20 August 1983 at Wembley Stadium and contested by Liverpool, who had won the 1982–83 First Division, and Manchester United, who had won the 1982–83 FA Cup. Manchester United won 2–0 with a brace from captain Bryan Robson. It was Liverpool's first competitive game under the management of Joe Fagan, who had been promoted from the coaching staff to replace the retiring Bob Paisley.

Match details

See also
 1982–83 Football League
 1982–83 FA Cup

1983
Charity Shield
Charity Shield 1983
Charity Shield 1983
Comm